East End is a neighborhood in Cincinnati, Ohio. It is the location of the Cincinnati Municipal Lunken Airport and Columbia Parkway. The population was 1,476 at the 2020 census.

The East End was home of the short-lived East End Park in the 1890s.

The neighborhood, a  strip along the Ohio River, once held Cincinnati's manufacturing district.

The East End is served by St. Rose Church.

Notable person
Jonathan Good, professional wrestler known as Jon Moxley and Dean Ambrose

References

Neighborhoods in Cincinnati